Herbert Henry Dow High School (H.H. Dow High School) is a public high school located in Midland, Michigan, United States. The school, a part of Midland Public Schools, is a National Blue Ribbon School of Excellence and in 2008 was named one of the top 20 High Schools in Michigan in a study commissioned by U.S. News & World Report.

History
The facility, also known as H.H. Dow High School, Dow High or Midland Dow is one of two high schools in the Midland Public School district, and a member of the Saginaw Valley High School Association. The facility was intended to alleviate overcrowding at Midland High School and construction of the  building was completed in 1968 at a cost of $9,172,303. The school was named in honor of Herbert Henry Dow, founder of the Dow Chemical Company, based in Midland. When the school opened in 1968, only sophomores were in attendance, and they would be the first class to graduate in 1971. One grade was added each year and the school included grades 10–12 until a freshman class was added in 1997. Music and athletic facilities were enhanced in 2005 as part of a  building expansion which cost $3,827,697.

Academics

Dow High School has been accredited by the North Central Association of Colleges and Schools every year since 1972. 
According to the 2016 school improvement plan, there were 85 staff and faculty members. Nearly two-thirds of the instructors held a Master's degree or higher and all were "highly qualified" for their teaching assignments.
The school was ranked as the 47th best high school in Michigan for 2021 by U.S. News & World Report. Advanced Placement classes are used by 32% of the students.
Students also have the option to participate in the International Baccalaureate Diploma Programme.

Athletics
Dow High School fields teams for cross country, football, soccer, golf, swimming, tennis, volleyball, basketball, bowling, cheerleading, hockey, wrestling, baseball, lacrosse, softball, track and gymnastics. The school's athletic teams compete in the Saginaw Valley League, MHSAA.

Hockey 
The Dow High School Hockey team captured the school's first hockey state championship on Saturday, March 12th, 2022, defeating Orchard Lake St. Mary’s in the finals by a score of 2-0.

Tennis 
The Dow High School Tennis team won their 7th tennis state championship on Saturday, October 15th, 2022, besting the field of 20 teams and finishing with 32 points. The team was coached by Terry Schwartzkopf, the recipient of the 2017-18 NFHS National Boys Tennis Coach of the Year.

Activities
The school offers more than 55 co-curricular clubs and activities open to students depending on level of interest, including student government, debate, quiz bowl, community service, language clubs.
Music choices include band, marching band, orchestra, choir, jazz ensembles, chamber music groups, and solo. 
Drama activities include all facets of a theatre production.
Art starts with beginning art, intermediate art, advanced 2D design, advanced 3D design, commercial art and IB/AP Visual Art. 

Approximately 80% of the student body is involved in co-curricular activities.

Demographics
Student population for 2020–21 was 1,258 with 84% White, 7% Asian, 4% Hispanic, 2% African American and 3% Other. The city of Midland has generally the same demographics.
Males comprise 51.6%; females 48.4%.
Student/Teacher ratio was 19.56/1
Enrollment by grade was balanced: 9th/319  10th/318  11th/301  12th/320
Free or reduced-cost lunch was available to 21.1% of the students.
 
The 2016 school improvement plan states that Dow Chemical Company is the major area employer and has been downsizing since 2012, resulting in a decrease of 160 students. The merger of Dow Corning and DuPont is expected to exacerbate the situation. The number of suspensions and total students suspended was halved from the 2011–12 school year (156/89) to the 2015–16 school year (65/45).

Notable alumni
 David Lee Camp, member of the United States House of Representatives
 Michael Cohrs, Group Executive Committee Deutsche Bank
 Meredith McGrath, former professional tennis player on the Women's Tennis Association
 Chuck Moss, member of the Michigan House of Representatives                                                                                        
 Joseph P. Overton, creator of the Overton Window                                                                                                                                                        
 Jalen Parmele, former Jacksonville Jaguars running back, drafted by the Miami Dolphins in the 6th round of the 2008 NFL Draft                     
 Bill Schuette, District Court of Appeals Judge, former member of the United States House of Representatives and Attorney General of the State of Michigan
 Steve Shelley, drummer for the band Sonic Youth
 Cheryl Studer, Grammy Award winning dramatic soprano
 Scott Winchester, former MLB pitcher for the Cincinnati Reds

References

External links

H. H. Dow High School website

Public high schools in Michigan
Midland, Michigan
Educational institutions established in 1968
Schools in Midland County, Michigan
1968 establishments in Michigan